The Philippines Football League, commonly known as PFL, is a Filipino professional football league sanctioned by the Philippine Football Federation (PFF). It is the Philippines' highest level of men's club football, supplanting the United Football League (UFL), which was previously the de facto top-tier league in the country. Starting from the 2020 season, the league is also known as The Philippines Football League brought to you by Qatar Airways, due to the league's title sponsorship.

The PFL has 6 seasons thus far (2017, 2018, 2019, 2020, 2021, 2022), 5 of which were won by United City F.C. (3 were earned as Ceres-Negros F.C. While 2 were earned as the current United City F.C.) But United City F.C. withdrawing in the 2021 season saw the championship fought between Azkals Development Team and Kaya F.C.–Iloilo, the latter winning the 2021 season. (In 2018, financial and logistical issues forced the disestablishment of the PFL with the Philippine Premier League established in its place. However, with the folding of the PPL after just one match day, the PFL was revived in mid-May 2019.

History

Origins
Following the success of the Philippines national team in the 2010 AFF Suzuki Cup, Philippine football experienced a renaissance. With no existing national football league, the Metro Manila-based United Football League (UFL) established itself as the de facto top-tier league in the Philippines. Under the guidance of the Football Alliance (FA) in partnership with United Football Clubs Association (UFCA), the UFL flourished. However, the PFF expressed the need to have a nationwide, community-based football league that is at par with the standards set by the Fédération Internationale de Football Association (FIFA) and the Asian Football Confederation (AFC). The UFL, which was under the National Capital Region Football Association, could not be considered as a national league.

Foundations

With the goal of establishing a truly nationwide professional football league in the Philippines, the PFF launched National League Task Force on December 2, 2013. The task force was led by PFF president Mariano Araneta Jr. and general secretary Edwin Gastanes, also composing of Filipino economist Bernie Villegas, UFL president Randy Roxas, AFC deputy general secretary and competition director Dato' Windsor John, Filipino FIFA official Domeka Garamendi, AFC kick-off program director Yogesh Desai, UFL commissioner Bonnie Ladrido, ABS-CBN's Dino Laurena, former PFF general secretary Cyril Dofitas and Gelix Mercader. The task force was tasked to do market research studies to determine the possible cities or regions where participating football clubs could be feasibly based, as well as assisting clubs in the Philippines to conform to the PFF club licensing regulations, of which the draft was initiated by Gastanes, with guidance from AFC. The PFF initially set a goal to launch the national league in two to three years from the inception of the task force.

Singaporean sports marketing agency, Red Card Group led by former Singaporean international, R. Sasikumar, assisted the PFF in the initial stages of planning the league.

Nielsen study
Nielsen was tasked by PFF, through funding from FIFA and AFC to conduct a study in 2015, where they identified 13 key localities throughout the Philippines as viable home venues for participating clubs in the PFL. Among the factors considered were existing infrastructures, accessibility, capacity of fans to pay, the existence of sponsors, and fan appreciation of the sport.

"Philippines Football League" was the most-preferred name for a prospective league according to a Nielsen survey which covered interviews of 5,000 people nationwide. Other choices included "P-League", "Maharlika League" (inspired by a feudal warrior class existing in the Luzon region during the pre-colonial era), "Liga Pilipina", and "Philippine Premier League".

Launch

The Philippines Football League was officially announced on September 7, 2016, and would be replacing the UFL as the Philippines' top-tier football league.

At least six teams from all over the Philippines was planned to be part of the PFL, with clubs from the UFL invited to join. Clubs were given until December 2016 to formally apply to join the PFL. The league competition was slated to begin in either the late March or early April in 2017.

By April 1, 2017, the PFF confirmed the participation of 8 clubs from - Ilocos United and Stallion Laguna from Luzon; JPV Marikina, Kaya F.C.–Makati (now Kaya F.C.-Iloilo) and FC Meralco Manila (now Loyola F.C.) from Metro Manila; Ceres–Negros (now United City) and Global Cebu (now Global F.C.) from the Visayas; Davao Aguilas from Mindanao.

The official launching of the PFL happened on April 21, 2017, at the Shangri-La at the Fort in Taguig. The program was started by economist and PFL Task Force Chairman, Bernardo Villegas and ended by PFF President Mariano Araneta.

2017 and 2018 seasons
The inaugural season in 2017 was contested by eight clubs and had two stages; the regular season and a playoff competition. The regular season adopted a home-and-away, double round-robin format. The top four teams in the regular season advanced to the play-off round, dubbed as the "Final Series", to determine the champions of the league. Ceres-Negros won the inaugural league title.

For the second season, the Final Series was scrapped due to the introduction of the Copa Paulino Alcantara, the cup competition for the league. The number of clubs in the league was reduced from eight to six after the departure of Ilocos United (then converted to a grassroots association) and FC Meralco Manila (that stayed active on a youth level ever since), both due to lack of investment and sponsorship, while Kaya-Makati F.C. relocated to Iloilo City and changed their name accordingly. Ceres-Negros won their second title.

Replacement by the Philippine Premier League

In late-2018, Triple CH led by Thailand-based Filipino businessman Bernie Sumayao became involved in the league and has entered talks with PFF chairman Mariano Araneta. He was appointed as the league's new commissioner. Sumayao pledged to institute financial and structural reforms in the league; including a rebrand of the league to the "Philippine Premier League" (PPL) starting the 2019 season, more favorable sponsorship policies, and the disestablishment of the franchise fee in favor of a less expensive registration fee for clubs.

At least eight teams were projected to play in the PPL's inaugural season. However, the end of the 2017 season also saw the departure of a third club in the league's history, Davao Aguilas F.C. Despite this, the league has received applications from several new clubs aspiring to join the PFL.

Revival and continued organization
The PPL effectively folded after the PFF announced that it has revoked its sanction of the league on May 3, 2019, due to its non compliance to the agreement with PFF. The PFL was consequently revived, with a third season planned to commence within the year. The new format proceeded as planned, with Ceres–Negros claiming their third consecutive league title despite internal managerial struggles.

The PFL secured a three-year sponsorship deal with Qatar Airways on January 26, 2020, with the Qatari firm becoming the Airline partner and Title Sponsor of the PFL. Negotiations for deal occurred as early as November 2019. The league was formally renamed as "The Philippines Football League brought to you by Qatar Airways" as a result of the sponsorship.

The 2020 season was postponed due to the COVID-19 pandemic and was later held in a bio-secure bubble in Carmona, Cavite from October 28 to November 9, 2020, while the edition of the Copa Paulino Alcantara was cancelled, due to the time constraints caused by the original postponement. Ceres-Negros, which had just sustained an ownership change and got renamed as "United City F.C.", then proceeded to win their fourth title in a row, with Kaya F.C.-Iloilo finishing second despite remaining unbeaten and thus becoming the first club in PFL's history to do so.

The same year saw the official entry in the competition of newly founded Azkals Development Team, directly controlled by the national football federation, as a guest team that would host mainly "homegrown" young talents, as well as some overage players, in order to expand the resources of the national team.

In 2021, following the rise of Philippines in the AFC rankings and the expansion of the AFC Champions League's group stage from 32 to 40 teams, United City became the first Filipino team to qualify for the group stage of the competition, as winners of the 2020 edition of the PFL. Plus, the 2021 season saw both the return of the league cup, set to be organized in April, and a slight expansion of the league, with PFL commissioner Coco Torre announcing in February that Loyola F.C. (returning to the league after competing for the last time in 2018) and former UFL team Laos F.C. (on his official debut) had submitted their respective requests to join the competition.

Competition format
The PFL followed a traditional home-and-away double round robin format from the 2018 to 2019 seasons, although some clubs did not have their home stadiums.

In the 2020 season, all matches are held in a bio-secure bubble in a single venue. Succeeding seasons will be held in a centralized venue with long-term plans to include reverting to a home-and-away format.

In the inaugural season of 2017, the league had two phases, the regular season, which adopted a home-and-away, double round-robin format, and the "Finals Series", a play-off round where the top four teams of the regular season played each other to determine the champions of the league. The Finals Series was not held for the succeeding seasons.

The league only had one division since its existence, but there are plans to introduce a second division as the league expands, with a system of promotion and relegation within the PFL to be put in place. There was a proposal to convert the former UFL to a second division tournament or a reserve league to the PFL.

The Copa Paulino Alcantara is the cup tournament of the PFL since the 2018 season.

Qualification for Asian competitions
Philippines Football League champions: group stage of the AFC Champions League.

History of Asian qualification
AFC Champions League
2017–2020: The league's champions qualify for the preliminary round of the play-offs, and they have to renounce to their slot in the AFC Cup in case of advancement to the group stage.
From 2021: The league's champions qualify directly for the group stage of the tournament; the winners of the Copa Paulino Alcantara (or the league's second placers, only for the 2020 season) qualify for the preliminary round of the play-offs, and they have to renounce to their slot in the AFC Cup in case of advancement to the group stage.
AFC Cup
2017: The league's second placers qualify directly for the group stage of the tournament, with third placers eligible to replace them whether they were unable to play in the competition; if the league's champions failed to advance to the group stage of AFC Champions League, they would still benefit from a free slot in the tournament.
2018–2020: The winners of the Copa Paulino Alcantara qualify directly for the group stage of the tournament; if the league's champions failed to advance to the group stage of AFC Champions League, they would still benefit from a free slot in the tournament.
From 2021: The winners of the Copa Paulino Alcantara (or the league's second placers, only for the 2020 season) qualify directly for the group stage of the tournament.

Clubs

Eleven clubs have played in the PFL since its inception in 2017, up to and including the 2022–23 season.

The following seven teams are competing in the 2022–23 edition; three of them have been competing since 2017.

The most recent expansion team is Cebu F.C., which made their debut in the 2021 season.

Timeline

Champions

Champions

By City

Organization

The Philippines Football League, along with the PFF Cup, is managed by Liga Futbol Inc.
Singapore-based Red Card Global, a sports marketing agency has exclusive commercial rights to the PFL.  Each club had to pay a franchise fee to participate in the league.  Reportedly in April 2017, the franchise fee was pegged at $500,000 by the PFF which can be paid by member clubs within a period of five years.

The league is professional in nature, clubs are intended to have a share of the league's broadcast revenues and sponsorship. Each club is allowed to be assisted by the league in securing their own sponsors.

The professional status of the league is recognized by the Games and Amusements Board, the regulatory body for professional sports in the Philippines.

In October 2018, the Philippines Football Federation was awarded the League Development award by the Asian Football Confederation for its organization of the PFL.

Club identity
All PFL clubs were required under the PFF club licensing regulations to have a name that includes the name of their home locality. The clubs were also required to have nicknames, crests, and colors based on the unique characteristics of their home locality.

Players and salaries
Participating clubs were allowed to have between 25 and 30 players. Reportedly in September 2016, four foreign players were to be allowed per club, with at least one coming from an AFC country. On January 17, 2017, it was reported that this foreign player limit rule was yet to be finalized by the PFF.

The PFL reportedly planned to have a salary cap and a salary floor.

Youth development
All participating clubs in the PFL were required to commit to the organization and development of at least two youth teams, one under 18 and another under 15. The clubs' youth teams were required to participate in competitions organized by the Philippine Football Federation.

Stadiums
The clubs of the PFL were required to have a certified home stadium either through ownership of the stadium or having an active contract with the owners of the stadium. Likewise, all clubs were required to have access to or own a training field and facility, although some clubs have been allowed to provisionally participate even without a designated home stadium.

Media coverage

The Philippine Football Federation had an agreement with the People's Television Network to broadcast matches of the league which was signed in April 2017 though the network coverage of the league didn't last at least half a season. Matches since then were live streamed through the MyCujoo online platform.

On February 22, 2018, the league had signed an agreement with Sportradar which would enable it livestream matches through Sportradar's Over-The-Top (OTT) platform. In April 2018, Liga Futbol Inc. approved a budget to secure a broadcasting partner for the 2018 season.

For the 2019 season, all matches were streamed on Facebook and the league's official website.

The Qatar Airways sponsorship deal signed with the league in January 2020 includes provisions to broadcast selected matches live on television. On October 15, during the virtual conference of the official launch of the 2020 PFL season, PFF President Mariano Araneta announced the partnership with One Play Sports as digital content partner. Matches for the 2020 season were broadcast on cable television through EXPTV on Cignal and on the PFL's social media.

Notes

References

 
Philippines
Sports leagues established in 2017
Football leagues in the Philippines
Professional sports leagues in the Philippines
2017 establishments in the Philippines